Cacciatori is an Italian surname. Notable people with the surname include:

Fabio Massimo Cacciatori (born 1961), Italian entrepreneur and film producer
Maurizia Cacciatori (born 1973), Italian volleyball player and sport commentator

See also

 
 Cacciatore (surname)
 Cacciatore (disambiguation)

Italian-language surnames